Pin-ups For Vets is a non-profit charitable organization dedicated to helping injured and ill American Soldiers, Marines, Airmen, National Guard members, Coast Guard members and Sailors—and current active-duty personnel. The project is the work of Gina Elise who sells and distributes the Pin-ups For Vets Calendar, which hearkens back to 1940s and 1950-style vintage pretty-girl images. The calendars are considered very tasteful by today's standards; they contain no frontal nudity, or nudity of any kind. Elise appears in various types of period costume and lingerie. Several other women are involved in the project as models besides Elise. Some of these women have served in the U.S. Armed Forces themselves. To date, the organization has donated over $50,000 to veterans hospitals.

Vintage hardware often features in Pin-ups For Vets photography, including old bikes, aircraft and military tanks. Elise also takes the time to travel to stateside military hospitals personally, delivering the calendars, posters, and T-shirts to wounded vets, soldiers, airmen, Marines, and seamen at their bedsides, and thanking them for their service. 
 
Elise was awarded the Volunteer of the Year award by the Los Angeles Business Journal on May 5, 2009 (as part of the newspaper's "Women Making a Difference" award series). In November 2010, Gina was featured on an Oprah Winfrey Show episode honoring American volunteers. Also in 2010, the movie Red (Bruce Willis and Helen Mirren, Summit Entertainment) featured Gina Elise in a scene showing her pin-up in a locker in the CIA headquarters.

Elise has so far raised over $50,000 for rehab programs that have gone to military and VA hospitals, and in 2007 won the Outstanding Young Californian award from the Junior Chamber of Commerce and California Jaycees. Eight flags have been flown in honor of the "Pin-ups For Vets" calendar project on various military bases worldwide. Gina hopes to eventually visit a VA hospital in each of the fifty States.

See also
 Pin-up girl
 List of charitable foundations

References

External links
 http://www.pinupsforvets.com/
 http://www.stripes.com/news/pinup-girl-makes-helping-veterans-her-mission-1.98962
 http://www.stripes.com/military-life/what-s-hot-vamping-for-veterans-1.69359
 http://www.stripes.com/news/old-school-pinup-calendar-raising-cash-for-veterans-1.60091
 http://www.salem-news.com/articles/february182008/pin_up_girl_2-18-08.php

Calendars
Charities based in California
American veterans' organizations